The Lister D is a 1.5 - 2.5hp stationary engine on petrol or petrol/paraffin (fuel) built between 1926-1965  by R A Lister and Company of Dursley.  It is popular with newcomers to the stationary engine hobby with un-restored examples available for as little as £100, plenty of spares and various re-manufactured parts and decals. It replaced the Lister H, which was of a similar output.  The first Lister D engine serial number 80,000 was assembled on the 26th October, 1926.

The engines were used to power water pumps, generators, cement mixers and much more. They had a chain drive ignition magneto, either the Lucas SR1, the Lucas RS1 or a M-l MK1(shaft driven and early chain driven), and an Amal float bowl. The engines were made in 1 hp, 1.5 hp, 2 hp and 2.5 hp versions. It was known as the  model D309 or simply the R.A. Lister. The engine was a 4 stroke poppet valve engine, and a simple centrifugal governing system.

Throughout the years of production, the engine changed very little. The fuel tank was moved from halfway up the engine to the top, and the shaft-drive magneto was replaced by a chain-driven unit in the early 1930s. D's were originally painted mid Brunswick green, but some World War II engines were painted in olive drab. A paraffin-fuelled engine was also available, called the Lister DK. It had two separate tanks, one for paraffin, and another for petrol. The engine was started on petrol, but could cut over to paraffin by means of a 3-way tap.

The engine used clockwise rotation as a standard, but some Anti-clockwise engines were produced. While they were a very sturdy, reliable engine, they did have a few flaws, one of which was that the water tap poured water over the oil filler.  This was easily corrected by the use of a rubber pipe.

The engine in the early days was a rival to the Ruston Hornsby PB, the Bamford EV1, the short-lived Fowler P series

Further reading
 David W. Edgington. The Lister D Story 1926-1964. UK: self-published, 2004. 54p.
 Nigel McBurney (edited by Gordon Wright). Stationary Engine on Lister D Type Restoration. Kelsey Publishing, 1997. 68p.

Stationary engines